Ed Hodgkiss (born October 23, 1970) is a former Arena Football League coach for the Los Angeles Avengers.

In 2001, Hodgkiss was hired from the Albany/Indiana Firebirds, where he served as their Offensive coordinator, to become the head coach of the Avengers. In his first season as head coach, Hodgkiss lead the Avengers to their first ever playoff berth. He was fired in June 2008.

References

External links
Ed Hodgkiss at ArenaFan Online
Los Angeles Avengers bio page

1970 births
Living people
People from Laurel, Maryland
American football wide receivers
Fairmont State Fighting Falcons football players
Indiana Firebirds  coaches
Players of American football from Maryland
Los Angeles Avengers coaches